Janet Knutson Jansson is an American biological scientist who is the Chief Scientist at the Pacific Northwest National Laboratory. She investigates complex microbial communities, including those found in soil and the human gut. Jansson is part of the Phenotypic Response of the Soil Microbiome to Environmental Perturbations Science Focus Area, and is a Fellow of the American Society for Microbiology.

Early life and education 
Jansson started her scientific career at New Mexico State University, where she majored in chemical engineering but selected electives in biology and soil science. She has said that her soil microbiology professor, William Lindemann, introduced her to microbiology. She moved to Colorado State University for her master's degree, where she started working on soil microbiology. She continued to explore oil biology in her doctoral research at Michigan State University, during which she developed gene probe methods for detecting bacteria in environmental samples. This was a new concept, because previously microorganisms could only be examined by microscopy. In 1988, she moved to Sweden.

Research and career 

Jansson was on the faculty at the Swedish University of Agricultural Sciences where she worked as a researcher, lecturer, professor and Chair of Environmental Biology. She left Sweden in 2007, and moved to Lawrence Berkeley National Laboratory as a senior staff scientist. She held a joint position at University of California, Berkeley and the University of Copenhagen.

In 2014, Jansson joined the Pacific Northwest National Laboratory, where she was made Chief Scientist for Biology. Her research considers multi-omics based strategies to investigate microbial organisms. She has studied how climate change impacts microbial communities in ecosystems: how warming impacts permafrost soil microbiomes and how drought impacts grassland soils. She is also interested in the human microbiome: how diet and disease impact the gut microbiome. She was the first to use molecular techniques such as genome sequencing to understand the human gut, gaining insight about the types of microbes that were involved in health and disease.

At the Pacific Northwest National Laboratory, Jansson leads the focus area on Phenotypic Response of the Soil Microbiome to Environmental Perturbations. The program looks to develop a comprehensive understanding of soil microbial responses to changing moisture. She served as President of the International Society for Microbiology. She was appointed to the National Academy of Sciences committee on Soil Sciences in 2020.

Selected publications

Books

References 

Living people
New Mexico State University alumni
Colorado State University alumni
Michigan State University alumni
21st-century American women scientists
21st-century American biologists
20th-century American women scientists
20th-century American biologists
American women biologists
Academic staff of the Swedish University of Agricultural Sciences
University of California, Berkeley faculty
Academic staff of the University of Copenhagen
Lawrence Berkeley National Laboratory people
American microbiologists
Women microbiologists
Fellows of the American Academy of Microbiology
American expatriates in Sweden